Endorphine is a 2015 Canadian drama film directed by André Turpin. It was shown in the Vanguard section of the 2015 Toronto International Film Festival. It had a limited release in a few French-Canadian theaters on 22 January 2016, and was made available for retail purchase on 3 May 2016.

Cast
 Sophie Nélisse as Simone de Koninck (13 years old)
 Mylène Mackay as Simone (25 years old)
 Lise Roy as Simone (60 years old)
 Monia Chokri as Simone's mother
 Stéphane Crête as Simone's father
 Anne-Marie Cadieux as the hypnotherapist
 Guy Thauvette as Mr. Porter

Reception
The film's technical cinematography was praised, but the confusing structure was described as cold and emotionless. According to the Toronto International Film Festival, the film "is an intoxicating cinematic puzzle that intertwines the lives of three seemingly unconnected characters."

References

External links
 
 

2015 films
2015 drama films
Canadian drama films
French-language Canadian films
2010s Canadian films
2010s French-language films